List of contemporary scholars of St. Augustine and Augustinian Traditions

 Lewis Ayres
 Gerald Bonner
 Donald Burt, O.S.A.
 Sarah Byers
 Michael Cameron
 Phillip Cary 
 John Cavadini
 Mary T. Clark
 R.D. Crouse
 Angelo Di Berardino, O.S.A.
 Robert Dodaro, O.S.A.
 Hubertus Drobner
Anthony Dupont
 Allan D. Fitzgerald, O.S.A.
 Michael P. Foley
 Prosper Grech, O.S.A.
 Wayne Hankey
 John LeRoy Harris
 Carol Harrison
 John Peter Kenney
 Paul R. Kolbet
 Mathijs Lamberigts
 George Lawless, O.S.A.
 Thomas F. Martin, O.S.A.
 David Vincent Meconi, S.J.
 Margaret Miles
 Douglas Milewski
 James J. O'Donnell
 John J. O'Meara
 Adam Ployd
 John M. Rist
 John K. Ryan
 Joseph C. Schnaulbelt, O.S.A.
 Edward L. Smither
 Stuart Squires
 Tarcisius Van Bavel, O.S.A.
 David van Dusen
 P. J. J. van Geest
 Frederick Van Fleteren
 Gerd Van Riel
 James Wetzel
 Rowan Williams

 
Augustine studies